Mangelia pulchrior is a species of sea snail, a marine gastropod mollusk in the family Mangeliidae.

Description

Distribution
This species occurs in the Pacific Ocean from Monterey, California, to Magdalena Bay, Lower California.

References

External links
  Dall, William Healey. Summary of the marine shellbearing mollusks of the northwest coast of America: from San Diego, California, to the Polar Sea, mostly contained in the collection of the United States National Museum, with illustrations of hitherto unfigured species. No. 112. Govt. print. off., 1921   
  Tucker, J.K. 2004 Catalog of recent and fossil turrids (Mollusca: Gastropoda). Zootaxa 682:1–1295.

pulchrior
Taxa named by William Healey Dall
Gastropods described in 1921